Microsoft Start is a mobile app that features news headlines and articles that MSN editors have chosen. The app includes sections for top stories, regional events, international events, politics, money, technology, entertainment, opinion, sports, and crime, along with other miscellaneous stories. The app is available for Android and iOS devices only; other users must use its web version.

Microsoft Start is the successor to Microsoft News and MSN, which are also available for Windows. With the release of Windows 11, however, Microsoft directly integrated news into Windows taskbar.

Predecessor
Microsoft News (formerly MSN News and Bing News) is the predecessor of Microsoft Start. It has been included with Windows Phone, Windows 8, Windows 8.1, and Windows 10. It is still available on the Microsoft Store. It allows users to set their own favorite topics and sources, receive notifications of breaking news though alerts, filter preferred news sources, and alter font sizes to make articles easier to read. Originally, News included an RSS feed, but that capability was removed; Microsoft currently only allows users to subscribe to specified news sources. News uses the live tile feature introduced in the Windows 10 Anniversary Update. If a user clicks on the News Start menu tile when a particular story is shown, the user will see a link to that story at the top of the app when it launches.

References

External links
 

News aggregators
News
Windows software
Universal Windows Platform apps
iOS software
Android (operating system) software
Windows Phone software
MSN
Microsoft Bing
Xbox One software